Shiruyeh (also Romanized as Shīrūyeh) is a village in Ruin Rural District, in the Central District of Esfarayen County, North Khorasan Province, Iran. At the 2006 census, its population was 46, in 11 families.

References 

Populated places in Esfarayen County